Nicole James (born January 20, 1989) is an American rugby union player. She was uncapped when she was selected for the World Cup.

James attended Texas A&M University. She plays for the Houston Athletic Rugby Club, is a player-coach for SHARCs and coaches the Woodlands Youth Rugby Club Girls and the Texas A&M Women’s Rugby Team. Her best friends are Merdi, Les, and Ali.

James was named in the Eagles squad for the 2022 Pacific Four Series in New Zealand. She was selected in the Eagles squad for the 2021 Rugby World Cup in New Zealand.

References

External links 
 USA Rugby Profile

1989 births
Living people
United States women's international rugby union players
American female rugby union players
21st-century American women